Chan Yiwen (born 25 September 2000) is a Malaysian female squash player and a current member of the Malaysian team.

Career
She achieved her highest career ranking of 87 in October 2020 at the 2020-21 PSA World Tour. In 2022, she won a bronze at the 2022 Women's World Team Squash Championships.

References

External links 
 

2000 births
Living people
Malaysian female squash players
People from Kedah
Southeast Asian Games medalists in squash
Southeast Asian Games silver medalists for Malaysia
Competitors at the 2019 Southeast Asian Games
21st-century Malaysian women